Sumaira Malik (born 19 December 1963) is a Pakistani politician who had been a member of the National Assembly of Pakistan from 2002 to October 2013.

Early life and education
She was born  on 19 December 1963.

She has done Master of Arts in Political Science from the University of the Punjab.

Political career
Malik was elected to the National Assembly of Pakistan from Constituency NA-69 (Khushab-I) as a candidate of National Alliance in the 2002 Pakistani general election. She received 71,925 votes and defeated Umer Aslam Khan, a candidate of Pakistan Muslim League (Q) (PML-Q). In September 2004, she was inducted into the federal cabinet of Prime Minister Shaukat Aziz and was appointed as Minister of State for Tourism.

She was re-elected to the National Assembly from Constituency NA-69 (Khushab-I) as a candidate of PML-Q in the 2008 Pakistani general election. She received 61,076 votes and defeated an independent candidate, Umer Aslam Khan.

She was re-elected to the National Assembly from Constituency NA-69 (Khushab-I) as a candidate of Pakistan Muslim League (N) in the 2013 Pakistani general election. She received 119,193 votes and defeated Umer Aslam Khan, a candidate of Pakistan Tehreek-e-Insaf.

She was disqualified from the National Assembly by the Supreme Court of Pakistan due to fake degree in October 2013.

She once served as the Minister of Women Development and Minister of State for Youth Affairs.

In May 2018, the Supreme Court of Pakistan declared election of Malik as chairperson of the Khushab district council as null and void.

In June 2018, SC allowed her to contest 2018 Pakistani general election overturning previous decision over the fake degree.

In July 2018 she lost election to Malik Umer Aslam Khan, a candidate of Pakistan Tehreek-e-Insaf.

References

Living people
1963 births
Pakistani MNAs 2002–2007
Pakistani MNAs 2008–2013
Pakistani MNAs 2013–2018
Women members of the National Assembly of Pakistan
Expelled members of the National Assembly of Pakistan
People from Khushab District
21st-century Pakistani women politicians